Angry Birds Toons is a Finnish short-form animated television series based on Rovio's Angry Birds. This animated series follows the adventures of the young birds as they guard their eggs against the piggies who want to steal them for their king to eat, as well as adventures from within each group, with episodes having been released weekly.

Episodes

Characters

Birds 
 Red is a red, round bird, and the leader of the flock. He is bossy, strict and poor at stress and anger management, and is perhaps the most dedicated to protecting the Eggs from being captured by the Pigs, he is mostly calm and spent time with the flock.
 Chuck is a yellow triangular-shaped bird who can move incredibly fast, to the point of even slowing down time. He is incredibly arrogant, narcissistic, dumb, and even possesses a hero complex at times, though he does have the flock's best interest at heart. He frequently causes problems for everyone around him due to his need to be in the spotlight.
 Bomb is a black bird with a "fuse" on top of its head and can cause explosions at will. The bomb is laid back, well-mannered and has an active imagination. He often plays an older brother or fatherly figure to the Blues.
 The Blues are a trio of bluebirds who are mischievous and fun-loving, pulling pranks on both the Pigs and the Birds. They're the youngest in the flock. Their names are Jay, Jake, and Jim.
 Matilda is a white mother hen with rosy cheeks that serves as the Mother Hen and the oldest of the group. A stereotypical hippy bird, nature-loving and always seeking peaceful solutions to problems, but losing her temper when things don't go as planned. She enjoys cooking, fine performing arts as a saxophonist, and an opera singer; and gardening.
 Terence is a large, dark crimson bird with a permanent grumpy appearance. He prefers to be silent and quiet, only growling for communicating, rarely makes eye contact, and never blinks. He normally moves around Weeping Angel style, disappearing and reappearing elsewhere only when other characters are not looking at him. His immense weight and stonewall personality are comically worked into the episode plots.
 Bubbles is a small, inflatable, orange bird that only makes an appearance in the series of Halloween-themed episodes. Like The Blues, he is mischievous and fun-loving, but sweet and energized. He has a one-track mind on acquiring more and more candy. He is also the only bird that doesn't appear with the rest of the flocks.

Pigs 
 Corporal Pig is a militaristic pig who wears a helmet with an ace of spades playing card. He reveres King Pig and likes to bully others and order the minion pigs around. According to his Angry Birds profile, he had accidentally glued his tin helmet to his scalp, though a couple of episodes show that it can be removed.
 King Pig is a large pig with a crown on his head. He is gluttonous, lazy, stupid, immature, and selfish. His ego is also very fragile, often behaving like a spoiled child when things don't go his way. A running gag in the show is that his palace is constantly being reduced to rubble by the various antics of both the birds and pigs, and he's also the king ruler of Piggy Island.
 Foreman Pig is a pig with a bright ochre-orange moustache and a vision-less eye who is in charge as a construction engineer. He occasionally leads the charge for stealing the birds' eggs when Corporal Pig isn't doing so.
 Chef Pig is a pig with a chef hat and a French moustache who cooks for the King and frequently helps with egg vandalism. He is incredibly devious and will act against even the other pigs, including the king if it suits him.
 Minion Pigs are the pigs who dutifully serve the King, although they would prefer to just have dumb fun. As a group, they are a competent and reliable workforce, having constructed an entire city for their kind, in stark contrast to the live-on-the-land lifestyle of the birds.
Professor Pig is an intelligent pig with square-lensed glasses and grey eyebrows, he owns a science lab in a house he shares with Foreman Pig, in the lab he runs multiple scientific experiments, but most of the time Foreman Pig changes the experiments into schemes for egg-stealing.
El Porkador is one of the Fat Pigs, he is used by Corporal Pig to intimidate the birds, due to his size and strength; but he is not used very commonly as he lacks agility.

Production
Rovio announced a TV series based on the Angry Birds video game series with 52 short episodes. The series was produced by the Finnish animation studio Kombo, which Rovio bought in June 2011. "I am happy to say we are going to roll out a weekly animation series this year of short format content," said Nick Dorra, head of the animation at Rovio. The series was made available worldwide on Angry Birds apps, selected video-on-demand services, and selected smart TVs.

Home media

Sony Pictures Home Entertainment (who coincidentally later released The Angry Birds Movie through Columbia Pictures) is the DVD/Blu-ray distributor for the series. While the first season got a Blu-Ray release, later releases starting with season two were only available on DVD.
 Angry Birds Toons: Season 1, Volume 1 (3 December 2013) 
 Angry Birds Toons: Season 1, Volume 2 (15 April 2014)
 Angry Birds Toons: Season 2, Volume 1 (1 December 2015)
 Angry Birds Toons: Season 2, Volume 2 (1 March 2016)
 Angry Birds Toons: Season 3, Volume 1 (16 August 2016)
 Angry Birds Toons: Season 3, Volume 2 (6 December 2016)

Specials
On 21 October 2011, before the series started, Rovio made a Halloween special as the trailer for the Angry Birds Seasons episode of Ham'o'ween, and as the backstory of how the bird Bubbles joined the flock of birds; later in the same year, Nickelodeon showed Angry Birds: Wreck the Halls, a Christmas special that aired on 17 December 2011, and which was included as a bonus feature on the Season 1, Volume 1 DVD; on 20 January of the next year, Nickelodeon showed Angry Birds: Year of the Dragon, a special celebrating the Chinese Year Of The Dragon, and the Angry Birds Seasons episode of the same name; and Angry Birds Space, an animated prequel to the video game of the same name in March 2012.

Book adaptation 
On January 1, 2016, Rovio And Kaiken Entertainment Ltd (Now Ferly Ltd) published a series of 4 books written by Les Spink called 'Angry Birds Toons Tales. The books contained more in-depth written versions of the first twelve episodes of the series, although the visuals shown in the books are the same as the visuals which appear in the animated versions of the episodes.

Spin-offs

Piggy Tales

On 11 April 2014, Rovio released a series titled Piggy Tales on their multi-platform broadcasting channel, Toons.TV, with the first episode called "Trampoline". The series show the minion pigs' life, with other exclusive characters to appear in various episodes, but no other pigs or birds were featured.

The first two seasons used claymation-style CGI to depict the pigs as they appeared in most Angry Birds games, with the latter two seasons shifting to complete computer-generated imagery and focusing on the pigs as they appeared as in Bad Piggies.

Angry Birds Stella

Based on the puzzle video game spin-off of the same name, the series is based around Stella, the pink bird, along with her friends Luca, Willow, Poppy, and Dahlia, as they work their way against Gale, the former friend of Stella, that currently is the queen of the pigs in Golden Island.

Angry Birds Blues

Another spin-off series, titled Angry Birds Blues. The series shows The Blues' life, along with the Hatchlings, and is set between the events of The Angry Birds Movie and its sequel. It premiered on 10 March 2017 on Toons.TV.

Angry Birds BirLd Cup
In the summer of 2018, on the eve of the 2018 FIFA World Cup in Russia, Rovio announced a new series, titled Angry Birds BirLd Cup, which leverages a partnership with the UK soccer/association football team Everton FC, in which Premier League stars hold a special contest between two teams of children, representing Red and Chuck.  The teams compete in special challenges to win the titular "Birld Cup", with the pigs keeping score.

Angry Birds on the Run
In the fall of 2018, Rovio announced a new series, titled Angry Birds on the Run, which leverages a partnership with Blink Industries, to create the first live-action Angry Birds series. The series shows that Red, Chuck, and Bomb fall out of a girl's phone, and they try to find the kid to get home before Rovio replaces them. The show was released on 17 November 2018 on YouTube. In the Spring of 2020, Rovio Entertainment announced the second season of the series with the first episode released on 13 June 2020.

References

External links
 
 

Angry Birds television series
2013 Finnish television series debuts
2016 Finnish television series endings
2010s animated television series
2010s Finnish television series
Finnish children's animated adventure television series
Finnish children's animated comedy television series
Finnish-language television shows
Flash television shows
KidsClick
Television series by Rovio Entertainment
Animated television series about birds
Animated television series without speech